Youxi is a town in Ruyuan Yao Autonomous County, Guangdong, China.

Administrative division
As of 2016, the town is divided into one community and eleven villages: 
 Zhongxin Community
 Zhongxindong
 Da
 Lengshuiqi
 Liantangbian
 Zhonglian
 Jiangbei
 Lie
 Daliaokeng
 Yingkeng
 Shangying
 Cilangkeng

History
It was formed as a township in 1953. In 1993, it was upgraded to a town. In 2005, Liukeng Town was merged into the town.

Geography
The town is situated at the northeastern Ruyuan Yao Autonomous County. It is surrounded by Bibei Town on the north, Dongping Town on the west, Guitou Town on the east, and Yiliu Town on the south.

The Xinjie River flows through the town northwest to east.

Economy
The local economy is primarily based upon agriculture and local industry. Economic crops are mainly watermelon, sugarcane, and peanut.

Demographics

As of 2018, the National Bureau of Statistics of China estimates the township's population now to be 12,805.

Transportation
The Provincial Highway S250 is a north–south highway in the town.

The National Expressway G0423 Lechang–Guangzhou Expressway passes across the town north to south.

References

Bibliography

 

Divisions of Ruyuan Yao Autonomous County
Towns in China